Synaldis is a genus of insects belonging to the family Braconidae.

The species of this genus are found in Europe and Northern America.

Species:
 Synaldis acutidens Fischer, 1967 
 Synaldis alfalfae Fischer, 1967

References

Braconidae
Braconidae genera